St. David was an Ontario provincial riding that existed from 1926 to 1987. It covered a section of the eastern city of Toronto east of Sherbourne Street and west of the Don River. The riding lasted until 1987 when it was merged with the neighbouring St. George to create a larger district called St. George—St. David.

Boundaries
In 1926 the riding was carved out of the existing ridings of Toronto Northeast and  Toronto Southeast with the following boundaries. The southern boundary was Toronto Harbour. Going north along the west side it formed a line following Sherbourne Street north to Bloor Street. The boundary went west to Yonge Street and north along Yonge to St. Clair Avenue. It went east along St. Clair until the street was interrupted by the Moore Park ravine. It followed the ravine southeast towards the Don River and then followed the river until it entered Toronto Harbour.

Prior to the 1934 election, the riding boundary at the north end was changed. Instead of following Bloor Street, the boundary instead went north following Sherbourne Street where it turned into MacLennan Avenue (now Sherbourne Street North). It followed this street north to the CPR right-of-way. It then went west along the right-of-way until it reached the Vale of Avoca ravine now occupied by David Balfour Park. It followed ravine north through the Mount Pleasant Cemetery until it reached a point where Yonge Street was crossed by the former Belt Line Railway right-of-way. It then turned east following the original Belt Line right-of-way which curved south to join up with the path of Mud Creek. It then went southeast towards the Don River.

In 1945 the northern boundary was altered to reflect a new street configuration. MacLennan Avenue was replaced by the following line of neighbourhood streets: Sherbourne Street North, Glen Road, Highland Avenue, Schofield Avenue before rejoining MacLennan Avenue. The southwest boundary was altered slightly so that the boundary followed the Don Roadway south instead of following the Keating Channel west.

In 1967 the boundaries were significantly altered. Starting at the foot of Parliament Street, the western boundary headed north to Bloor Street. It then headed west to Yonge Street where it turned north again ending at Davisville Avenue just south of Eglinton Avenue. The boundary then went east along Davisville to Bayview Avenue, then south along Bayview to Moore Avenue, west along Moore Avenue before heading southeast following the Mud Creek to the Don River. The river was followed to a point just north of the Bloor Viaduct where the old Toronto city limits was met. It turned east following the city limits until it reached Jackman Avenue. The boundary then turned south and followed Jackman Avenue, Hampton Avenue, Sparkhall Avenue, Broadview Avenue, Gerrard Street East, DeGrassi Street, Queen Street East and finally Carlaw Avenue and this was followed south to end at the outer Toronto Harbour.

In 1975 the northern boundary was altered slightly. It was moved north from Davisville Avenue to Manor Road between Yonge Street and Bayview Avenue. No other changes were made. The boundaries remained like this until 1987 when it was merged with the neighbouring riding of St. George to form St. George—St. David.

Members of Provincial Parliament

Election results

1926 boundaries

1934 boundaries

1945 boundaries

1967 boundaries

References

Notes

Citations

Former provincial electoral districts of Ontario
Provincial electoral districts of Toronto